Wayne Cheesman is a Canadian former ice hockey left winger.  He was drafted 4th overall by the Minnesota North Stars in the 1967 NHL Amateur Draft but never played in the National Hockey League, or indeed professionally at all.

After his playing career ended, Cheesman had a spell as head coach of the Markham Waxers.

External links

Profile at hockeydraftcentral.com

Canadian ice hockey left wingers
Living people
Minnesota North Stars draft picks
National Hockey League first-round draft picks
Oshawa Generals players
Year of birth missing (living people)